"Eins, Zwei, Polizei" (English: One, Two, Police) is a 1994 song recorded by Italian dance musician Mo-Do (a.k.a. Fabio Frittelli) and was released as the debut single from his first and only album, Was Ist Das? (1995). The song got its inspiration from "Der Kommissar" by Austrian singer Falco and "Da Da Da" by German band Trio, both released in the early 1980s. It was co-produced by Claudio Zennaro and Fulvio Zafret, and achieved great success in many European countries. "Eins, Zwei, Polizei" reached number-one in Austria, Germany and Italy. It has since been remixed and re-released several times. In 1995, it was remixed by DJ XTC of Chile. In 2000, it was re-released in a remix by Maurizio Ferrara, in 2008 with remixes by German DJ Blutonium Boy and Floorfilla, and in 2019 the song was reworked by Dutch-Turkish DJ Ummet Ozcan.

Chart performance
"Eins, Zwei, Polizei" was very successful on the charts in Europe, remaining Frittelli's biggest hit. It peaked at number-one in Austria, Germany and Italy, and was a number two hit in Belgium, Denmark and the Netherlands. Additionally, the single made it to the top 10 also in Finland, France, Spain, Sweden and Switzerland, as well as on the Eurochart Hot 100, where it soared to number four. In the United Kingdom, "Eins, Zwei, Polizei" reached number 81 in its first week at the UK Singles Chart, on 9 October 1994. In Scotland, it peaked at number 76. The single earned a gold record in both Austria and Germany, with a sale of 25,000 and 250,000 units.

Music video
The accompanying music video for "Eins, Zwei, Polizei" was directed by Giuseppe Capotondi, an Italian director of feature films, music videos and commercials. It was A-listed on Germany's VIVA in September 1994, and later published on YouTube in May 2015. As of October 2022, the video had generated more than 47 million views.

Track listings

Charts

Weekly charts

Year-end charts

Certifications

References

1994 debut singles
1994 songs
German-language songs
Mo-Do songs
Music videos directed by Giuseppe Capotondi
Number-one singles in Austria
Number-one singles in Germany
Number-one singles in Italy